The Bowler Communications System is an open protocol developed by Neuron Robotics for simplified communications between components in cyber-physical systems.

External links 

 https://web.archive.org/web/20140527071007/http://neuronrobotics.github.io/Protocol/

Robotics
Computer-mediated communication